Professor Dame Donna Kinnair DBE (born 1960 or 1961) is a British nurse and former Chief Executive and General Secretary of the Royal College of Nursing (RCN). She has specialised in child protection, providing leadership in major hospital trusts in London, teaching, and advising on legal and governmental committees.

Education and career 
Kinnair was born in 1960 or 1961.

She initially pursued a maths degree but decided not to complete it. She later returned to education having been encouraged by an occupational health nurse to take up nursing. Kinnair credits her experience growing up with an asthmatic father with showing her the impact nursing could have on people. She attended the Princess Alexandra School of Nursing at the Royal London Hospital in Whitechapel in 1983 to train as a nurse.

Following her training, Kinnair worked with HIV and intensive care patients in east London. She subsequently worked as a health visitor in Hackney, Newham and Tower Hamlets and pursued further studies, gaining a master's degree in medical law and ethics. Her new qualifications led her to focus on child protection in south London. Notably, she was one of four expert advisers in the 2001 Laming inquiry into the death of eight year old Victoria Climbié.

Kinnair has held several senior positions in the healthcare sector including:

 Strategic Commissioner for Children's Services at Lambeth, Southwark and Lewisham health authority
Clinical Director of Emergency Medicine at Barking, Havering and Redbridge University Hospitals Trust
 Executive Director of Nursing, Southeast London Cluster Board
 Director of Commissioning, London Borough of Southwark & Southwark Primary Care Trust

Further to her positions in the healthcare sector, Kinnair has taught medical law, ethics and child protection in multiple countries including Britain, New Zealand, Russia and Kenya. In addition she has provided advice to the UK government on nursing and midwifery through her work with the prime minister's commission in 2010.

In 2015, Kinnair was appointed Head of Nursing of the Royal College of Nursing (RCN),  after which she was promoted to Director for Nursing, Policy and Practice in 2016. In August 2018 she was appointed acting Chief Executive and General Secretary before being confirmed on a permanent basis in April 2019.

In 2020 Kinnair had been recognised for her influence, having been listed in the 2020 Powerlist - which lists the 100 most influential Britons of African/African Caribbean descent., and in 2021 Kinnair reached the top 10 of the Powerlist 2021 in recognition of her work during the COVID-19 pandemic.

In 2021, Kinnair resigned from her role as Chief Executive and General Secretary of the Royal College of Nursing (RCN) following a "period of ill health" due to a cycling incident.

Awards and honours 

 Dame Commander of the Order of the British Empire (2008 Birthday Honours)
LEGEND CA Award, C. Hub magazine (2016)

Personal life 
Kinnair has three children.

References 

Nurses from London
Dames Commander of the Order of the British Empire
Year of birth missing (living people)
Living people
1960s births